The Columbia University Physics Department includes approximately 40 faculty members teaching and conducting research in the areas of astrophysics, high energy nuclear physics, high energy particle physics, atomic-molecular-optical physics, condensed matter physics, and theoretical physics. 

This research is conducted in Pupin Hall and the Shapiro Center for Engineering and Physical Sciences Research (CEPSR), both on the university's Morningside Heights campus, Nevis Labs upstate, and at a number of other affiliated institutions. The department is connected with research conducted at Brookhaven National Laboratories and at CERN. 

Columbia has approximately 20 undergraduate physics majors and is home to about 100 graduate students.

History
The roots of graduate physics can be traced back to the opening of the School of Mines in 1864 although the department was only formally established in 1892. In 1899 the American Physical Society was founded at a meeting at Columbia. Several years later, the Earnest Kempton Adams Fund enabled the department to invite distinguished scientists to the school. Among the distinguished EKA lecturers were Hendrik Lorentz (1905-1906) and Max Planck (1909). During Lorentz's stay at Columbia he wrote one of his most important works, the Theory of Electrons.

By 1931, Pupin Labs was a leading research center. During this time Harold Urey (Nobel laureate in Chemistry) discovered deuterium and George B. Pegram was investigating the phenomena associated with the newly discovered neutron. In 1938, Enrico Fermi escaped fascist Italy after winning the Nobel prize for his work on induced radioactivity. In fact, he took his wife and children with him to Stockholm and immediately emigrated to New York. Shortly after arriving he began working at Columbia. His work on nuclear fission, together with Rabi's work on atomic and molecular physics, ushered in a golden era of fundamental research at the university. One of the country's first cyclotrons was built in the basement of Pupin Hall, where parts of it still remain.

Before and after the Second World War, research was conducted into the magnetic moments of nuclei and electrons. Together with Willis Lamb's work on the understanding of the fine structure of hydrogen, these experiments were crucial to the later development of quantum electrodynamics, for which Feynman and Schwinger won the Nobel prize. During this same time Chien-Shiung Wu was conducting landmark research at Nevis on weak interactions, which led to the theoretical prediction and subsequent observation of maximal parity nonconservation.

During the war, many microwave techniques were learned that were later used at Columbia for the development of the maser, the microwave precursor to the laser, at to the observation of large nuclear quadrupole moments, which led to the introduction of the unified nuclear model by James Rainwater. In the 1940s theoretical research was focussed on calculations in quantum electrodynamics. In the 1950s, there was a shift towards high-energy physics. During this time Tsung-Dao Lee and his collaborators' work led to the discovery of parity and charge conjugation symmetries in the weak interaction. During these years, a new, more powerful cyclotron was also built at Nevis.

As physicists investigated matter at ever finer scales, higher energy experiments were required. Many of these were done at Nevis and at Brookhaven. Rainwater and Fitch explored the structure of nuclei by observing x-ray transitions in muonic atoms. Richard Garwin and Leon Lederman observed parity nonconservation in pion and muon decay. Lederman, Schwartz, and Steinberger proved that the muon neutrino was distinct from the electron neutrino.

Today, Columbia experimenters conduct work at labs across the world. These include CERN, in Geneva, Switzerland, Brookhaven National Laboratory, in Upton, New York, and Fermi National Accelerator Laboratory, in Batavia, Illinois. Pupin Labs also houses a 400-Gigaflops dedicated supercomputer built by Norman Christ, which is used for calculations in lattice quantum chromodynamics.

Nobel laureates
Scientists who have received the Nobel Prize for work done while on faculty at Columbia University:
 Polykarp Kusch
 Willis Lamb
 Charles Townes
 Tsung-Dao Lee
 James Rainwater
 Leon Lederman
 Melvin Schwartz
 Jack Steinberger

Other faculty:
 Enrico Fermi
 Hideki Yukawa
 Willis Lamb
 Maria Goeppert-Mayer
 Samuel Chao Chung Ting
 Steven Weinberg
 Horst Störmer

Scientists who received the Nobel Prize and have doctorates from Columbia University:
 Isidor Isaac Rabi
 James Rainwater
 Leon Lederman
 Melvin Schwartz
 Robert Millikan
 Julian Schwinger
 Leon Cooper
 Val Fitch
 Arno Penzias
 Norman Ramsey
 Martin Lewis Perl

Visiting professors:
 Murray Gell-Mann
 Hans Bethe
 Daniel Tsui

Research staff:
 Maria Goeppert-Mayer
 Aage Bohr
 Arthur Leonard Schawlow
 Carlo Rubbia

EKA Lecturers:
 Hendrik Lorentz
 Wilhelm Wien
 Max Planck

See also
 Columbia University
 Michael Idvorsky Pupin
 Nevis Laboratories
 Fu Foundation School of Engineering and Applied Science

References
This article is an adaptation of the summarized history found at the Columbia University physics department homepage:
 Department Homepage
 Heritage of Physics at Columbia
 Columbia Nobels

Columbia University
Physics departments in the United States
Institutes associated with CERN